Gloria Stivic is a fictional character played by Sally Struthers on the American situation comedy All in the Family (which aired on the CBS television network from 1971 until 1979) and the spin-off series Gloria (CBS, 1982–83). The only child of Archie and Edith Bunker, Gloria is married to—and eventually divorced from—Michael Stivic. She was born 11 months after Archie and Edith were married, according to the fifth season episode “The Longest Kiss”.

Character overview
Gloria is often caught in the middle of arguments between her liberal husband Michael and her conservative father, Archie. As her relationship with Michael progresses, Gloria concludes that her father is wrong about a lot of things and sides with her husband's liberal beliefs. Despite his affection for her, Michael is also using his marriage to persuade long-sheltered Gloria to share his own beliefs as well.

Edith mentions (in the pilot) that Gloria was overprotected as a child due to being anemic. Archie often refers to her as his "little goil" [girl].

In season 7's "Mike and Gloria Meet", it is explained that Mike and Gloria met in 1969, the evening of President Nixon's inauguration (Michael had been planning to protest the event, but opted to go on a blind date with Gloria instead). They did not initially like each other, until they discovered that they share a mutual love of ballroom dancing. They married in 1970 in Archie and Edith's home in a civil ceremony (as a means of compromise between Archie's wish that they are wed by a Protestant minister and Michael's Uncle Cass' preference for a Catholic priest).

Gloria is the main breadwinner for the couple while they live in her parents' home during their first five years of marriage. With Michael attending college, initially for a bachelor's degree and then continuing for his master's, Gloria works full-time at a department store. She is sensitive about having only a high school education and sometimes feels that Michael condescends to her, particularly during arguments.

Upon Michael's graduation, he and Gloria move to the neighboring rental property owned by former neighbor George Jefferson, where the Jeffersons reside between seasons 1 and 5. At that time Gloria becomes pregnant. She gives birth to a boy, Joey Stivic, and becomes a stay-at-home mother, while Michael begins his teaching career. The Stivics later move to Santa Barbara, California after Michael is offered a better paying associate professor's position at the University of California, Santa Barbara (UCSB).

The Stivic marriage is tested after Gloria engages in an affair with Bud Kreeger, a college faculty colleague of her husband. Gloria confesses this affair to her parents, while remaining silent about sleeping with him, during Archie and Edith's Christmas visit to California.

Michael and Gloria are later arrested for engaging in a nude protest at a proposed nuclear power plant site. This costs Michael his well-paid job at UCSB and leaves the Stivics cash-strapped. Eventually, Michael abandons his wife and son to join a commune with one of his students, betraying a promise he makes to Archie before leaving for California that he will always take care of Gloria and Joey.

Struthers continued playing the character of Gloria Bunker in guest appearances on Archie Bunker's Place and on the 1982–1983 related series Gloria, in which she is divorced from Michael and finds employment in an upstate New York veterinarian's office. In this series, she is working towards becoming a fully qualified veterinarian's assistant while raising Joey as a single mother. Over the course of the show, she becomes romantically involved with Clark V. Uhley, Jr., another assistant in the same practice.

References

Television characters introduced in 1971
All in the Family characters
Fictional Democrats (United States)
Fictional clerks
Fictional characters from Queens, New York
Fictional characters from Santa Barbara, California
Fictional salespeople